was a town located in Mine District, Yamaguchi Prefecture, Japan.

As of October 1, 2004, the town had an estimated population of 6,198 and a population density of 47.9 persons per km². The total area was 129.49 km².

On March 21, 2008, Mitō, along with the town of Shūhō (also from Mine District), was merged into the expanded city of Mine.

External links
Mine City official website 

Dissolved municipalities of Yamaguchi Prefecture
Populated places disestablished in 2008
2008 disestablishments in Japan